The Ramon T. Diaz National High School (RTDNHS) is a public secondary school located in Brgy. Adela Heights, Gandara, Samar, Philippines.

History 
The institution's original name was Gandara National High School (GNHS) established in 1970. This was later changed to Ramon T. Diaz Memorial High School (RTDMHS) in honor to the late mayor of the town, Ramon T. Diaz. In 2019, the school administration, pursuant to the directive of Department of Education, officially changed the word "memorial" to "national".

References

High schools in the Philippines